Kelly Mountain can refer to the following mountains:

Other places
 Kelly Mountain, near Mount Kelly, Queensland, Australia
 Kellys Mountain, in Victoria County, Nova Scotia, Canada

United States
Kelly Mountain (Alaska)
Kelly Mountain (Arkansas)
Kelly Mountain (California)
Kelly Mountain (Georgia)
Kelly Mountain (Blaine County, Idaho)
Kelly Mountain (Bonneville County, Idaho)
Kelly Mountain (Idaho County, Idaho)
Kelly Mountain (Kootenai County, Idaho)
Kelly Mountain (Washington County, Idaho)
Kelly Mountain (Penobscot County, Maine)
Kelly Mountain (Somerset County, Maine)
Kelly Mountain (Montana), a mountain in Lake County
Kelly Mountain (Oregon)
Kelly Mountain (Chelan County, Washington)
Kelly Mountain (Ferry County, Washington)
Kelly Mountain (West Virginia)

References